The Slave Route Project is a UNESCO initiative that was officially launched in 1994 in Ouidah, Benin. It is rooted in the mandate of the organization, which believes that ignorance or concealment of major historical events constitutes an obstacle to mutual understanding, reconciliation and cooperation among peoples. The project breaks the silence surrounding the slave trade and slavery that has affected all continents and caused great upheavals that have shaped our modern societies. In studying the causes, the modalities and the consequences of slavery and the slave trade, the project seeks to enhance the understanding of diverse histories and heritages stemming from this global tragedy.

Objectives and main themes 

The concept of a route seeks to reflect the dynamics of the movement of peoples, civilizations and cultures. The concept of slave focuses on the universal phenomenon of slavery, and in particular, the transatlantic, Indian Ocean and Trans Saharan slave trades. The Slave Route Project has three main objectives: 
To assist in providing a better understanding of the causes, forms of operation, issues and consequences of slavery in the world (specifically Africa, Europe, the Americas, the Caribbean, the Indian Ocean, the Middle East and Asia);
To present some of the global transformations and cultural interactions that have resulted from this history and
To contribute to a culture of peace by promoting reflection on cultural pluralism, intercultural dialogue and the construction of new identities and citizenships.

Drawing on the ideas and work of an International Scientific Committee, the project deals with various aspects of the slave trade, and in particular provides:
Support for scientific research through a network of international institutions and specialists;
Development of educational materials;
Collection and preservation of written archives and oral traditions;
Inventory and preservation of memorial sites and places;
Promotion of living cultures;
Promotion of diverse contributions from the African diaspora;
Promotion of standard-setting instruments.

The Slave Route

Transatlantic trade 
The transatlantic slave trade and its Middle Passage are unique within the universal history of slavery for three main reasons. Firstly, it endured for approximately four centuries. Secondly, the victims of this trade were exclusively black African men, women and children. Finally, its intellectual legitimization - the development of an anti-black ideology and its legal organization through the notorious Code Noir.

As a commercial and economic enterprise, the slave trade provides a dramatic example of the consequences resulting from particular intersections of history and geography. It involved several regions and continents: Africa, Americas, the Caribbean, Europe and the Indian Ocean. This slave trade is often considered one of the first systems of globalization. This 'triangular' trade connected the economies of three continents.

The transatlantic slave trade was the biggest deportation in history and a determining factor in the world economy of the 18th century. It is estimated that between 25 and 30 million people were deported from their homes and sold as slaves in the different slave trading systems. It is estimated that 17 million of these people were traded in the transatlantic route. These figures exclude those who died aboard the ships and in the course of wars and raids connected to the trade.

The trade proceeded in three steps, often called the triangular slave trade. The ships left Western Europe for Africa loaded with goods which were to be exchanged for slaves. Upon their arrival in Africa, the captains traded their merchandise for captive slaves. Weapons and gunpowder were the most important commodities but textiles, pearls and other manufactured goods, as well as rum, were also in high demand. The exchange could last from one week to several months. The second step was the crossing of the Atlantic. Africans were transported to Americas to be sold throughout the continent. The third step connected Americas to Europe. The slave traders brought back mostly agricultural products, produced by the slaves. The main product was sugar, followed by cotton, coffee, tobacco and rice.

Trade in the Indian Ocean 

The societies of the Indian Ocean, including Comoros, Madagascar, Mauritius, Réunion, Seychelles, came into being at different times through ancient slave trades and the migrations of populations from Africa, Asia and Europe.

Systems of slavery had existed in the islands of the Indian Ocean since before colonization. This was particularly the case in Madagascar and the Comoros Islands, where slaves were brought by Swahili traders from the east coast of Africa.

The arrival of Europeans to the Indian Ocean in the 17th and 18th centuries saw the revitalization of the slave trade in this region and at heightened levels. This led to the population and exploitation of the Mascarene Islands. Severing millions of people from their roots, this system of slavery saw the establishment of a new society. For example, new oral traditions developed throughout the period of slavery as slaves were forbidden to read and write up to the time of the abolitions.

The Oral Tradition

UNESCO’s research program that seeks to identify and register the oral memory of the islands of the south-western Indian Ocean, working from within the framework of The Slave Route Project, has highlighted the need to safeguard the oral heritage of the islands that have experienced the slave trade and slavery.

On the UN day for remembrance of the slave trade, it is worth highlighting the abominable 17th-century Dutch practice of shipping “human cargo” around the Indian Ocean rim. The slave trade is said to be among the oldest trades in the world but that it was practised by the Dutch, during their sojourn at Pulicat in Tamil Nadu, from 1609 to 1690, may be news to many. Textiles and slaves were the most profiteering "merchandise" exported by the Dutch at Pulicat to their Indian Ocean trade headquarters at Batavia (Jakarta), in exchange for rare spices like nutmeg and mace. Slaves were sought for spice and other cash crop plantations in Batavia and also to work as domestic helps for Dutch masters. Hence, only those in the age group of eight to 20 were preferred for “export” from Pulicat, the nodal port on the Coromandel Coast.

Procuring slaves
On the Coromandel Coast, the Dutch had two means of procuring slaves: either purchasing them from their parents during natural calamities like droughts, poor harvests and famines, or capturing them during cultural calamities like invasions. During calamities the price of a slave child was 3/4 pagoda (four guilders), whereas in times of good harvest, the price was 14-16 pagodas (27-40 guilders), which the Dutch traders said was "uneconomic". The Indian agents of the Dutch often kidnapped passersby in the market place, so that local youth were mortally afraid of frequenting public places in Pulicat and even ran away to the nearby forests. Between 1621 and 1665, 131 slave ships were deployed by the Dutch to export 38,441 slaves to Batavia from Pulicat. Apart from the annual quota of about 200-300 slaves, waves of mass exports took place during calamities. For instance, 1,900 slaves were sent from Pulicat and Devanampatnam (near Cuddalore) during the 1622-23 famine, and 1,839 slaves were sent from Madura during the drought of 1673–77 to Batavia. Small boys and girls from Thanjavur were sent to Ceylon, Batavia and Malacca. Finally, between 1694 and 1696, from Thanjavur, 3,859 slaves were sent to Ceylon. Invasion by the Bijapur sultan during 1618-20 saw 2,118 slaves from Thanjavur, Senji (Gingee), Madura, Tondi, Adirampatnam, Kayalpatnam (near Tuticorin), Nagapatnam and Pulicat exported to Ceylon, Batavia and Malacca.

Rebellion

Slaves were huddled together in poorly ventilated slave ships and were sanctioned a daily ration of uncooked rice to eat with sea water. One-third or even half of such shipments of “pieces of human cargo”, as the Dutch called them, died in transit due to dehydration, gastro-intestinal problems and epidemics. Dutch physicians on board were not familiar with tropical diseases. Amputations, if needed during the voyage, were done by sawing off the limbs on a wooden peg on deck, and most such cases ended in death due to sepsis. After reaching their destination, rebellions and mutinies by slaves did occur. Some slaves ran away into the forests or by local country craft to abandoned islands and died there due to starvation.

Portuguese predecessors
The Portuguese on the west coast of India were the European pioneers in slave trade during the late 15th century. They migrated to Pulicat on the east coast in 1502, a 100 years before the arrival of the Dutch. At Pulicat, the Portuguese constructed two churches in Madha Kuppam which still exist. They converted local people to Catholicism and educated them through the Portuguese language. Indian slaves lodged in the eastern suburbs of Batavia, called Mardijkers, were said to be Portuguese speaking Catholics, betraying their Pulicat origins. The Portuguese, who converted and educated them, would not have exported them as slaves and it was the Dutch in later days that exported them. However, Portuguese traders (chatins), in collaboration with the Magh pirates from Arakan (Burma), used armed vessels (galias) to capture Bengali slaves from the Chittagong (Bangladesh) estuaries and exported them to Batavia. End of the tradeFrom the mid-18th to the mid-19th centuries, a great many stalwarts in England campaigned against slave trade. Chief among them were the poet William Cowper (1731–1800); ex-slave Olaudah Equiano (1745–1797) from Nigeria; John Newton (1725–1807), former slave trader turned Anglican clergy and author of the popular hymn "Amazing Grace"; British MP William Wilberforce (1759–1833); and John Wesley (1703–1791), founder of the Methodist Christian Mission. Cowper wrote in 1785: "We have no slaves at home — Then why abroad? Slaves cannot breathe in England; if their lungs receive our air, that moment they are free. They touch our country, and their shackles fall. That’s noble, and bespeaks a nation proud. And jealous of the blessing. Spread it then, And, let it circulate through every vein.” In his stirring poem written in 1788, entitled “The Negro’s Complaint", he appeals: "Is there, as ye sometimes tell us, Is there One who reigns on high? Has He bid you buy and sell us; Speaking from his throne, the sky?" The trans-Atlantic slave trade by the Dutch from Africa to Europe and to the New World was much larger and much researched on, than their Indian Ocean slave trade from Pulicat to Batavia and Ceylon (Sri Lanka). Today, on the UN's International Day for the Remembrance of the Slave Trade and its Abolition, we would do well to condemn this abominable episode in history and use the occasion to renounce bonded labour, and all kinds of inhuman subjugations practised even today.

Additionally, UNESCO’s programme to trace oral memory has generated growing interest in the preservation of memory among populations affected by the trade. As such, in 2001 and 2002 documentary programmes were launched at the University of Mauritius, the Nelson Mandela Centre, the Seychelles National Institute of Education, the Abro in Rodrigues and the CNDRS in the Comoros. These programmes are continuing with both inventory and field training activities, and important documents have been digitized and stored in archives of the national institutions of the islands and can be accessed by the general public.

An Inventory of Sites of Memory in the Indian Ocean Region

Significant results have been achieved through the programme developed in collaboration with UNESCO that identified and catalogued oral heritages. These results are particularly visible in the Indian Ocean region (Réunion, the Comoros Islands, Mauritius and Rodrigues, the Seychelles Islands and Madagascar). It is now possible to envision the drafting of an exhaustive list of all sites linked to the memory of the slave trade. To fully achieve this, the programme must take into account the specificity of the slave trade in the region such as its development over a thousand years, and its continuation after the legal abolition of slavery under the guise of recruiting. Some of the islands of the Indian Ocean, such as Réunion, Mauritius, and the Seychelles, have already registered some of the sites linked to the slave trade. The project, which will be implemented during the 2006-2007 biennium, will begin by listing sites in Madagascar and the Comoros Islands, as they have not yet established an exhaustive list of their sites and places of memory.

The project will be coordinated by the UNESCO Chair after a regional scientific committee has been established. The committee is to be supported by local authorities as well as regional scientific institutions and academia.

Underwater Archaeology

The project entitled l'Utile...1761, Esclaves oubliés (Forgotten slaves) includes a component for underwater archaeological research on a slave ship that sank off the coast of Tromelin Island, abandoning its cargo of slaves from Madagascar on the island.

Trade in the Arab-Muslim world 

The international seminar on "Cultural interactions generated by the slave trade and slavery in the Arab-Muslim World" was organized by UNESCO (17–19 May 2007, Rabat and Marrakech, Morocco) in the framework of the Slave Route Project, in cooperation with the Moroccan National Commission for UNESCO and the UNESCO Office Rabat. This international encounter aimed to reinforce the activities of the project in lesser-studied regions, in particular the Arab–Muslim World.

The Colloquium brought together experts from sub-Saharan Africa, the Maghreb and the Middle East, selected on the basis of their expertise and experience in issues related to the slave trade and slavery in this part of the world.

Resistances and abolitions 

The American colonies were frequently disrupted by slave revolts or threats of revolt. The first fighters for the abolition of slavery were the captives and slaves themselves, who adopted various methods of resistance throughout their enslavement, from their capture in Africa to their sale and exploitation on plantations in the Americas and the Caribbean. Main forms of resistance included rebellion and also suicide.

As early as the late 17th century, individuals, as well as the various abolitionist societies that had been established, began condemning slavery and the slave trade. This essentially originated from the English-speaking countries. Up until the end of the 19th century British, French and North American abolitionists devised a set of moral, religious and occasionally economic arguments as a means of combating the slave trade and slavery.

An Irreversible Process

The destruction of the slave systems began in the French colony of Saint-Domingue (today Haiti) on the island of Hispaniola towards the end of the eighteenth century. The slave rebellion in Saint-Domingue in August 1791 profoundly weakened the Caribbean colonial system, sparking a general insurrection that lead to the abolition of slavery and the independence of Haiti. It marked the beginning of a triple process of destruction of the slavery system, the slave trade and colonialism.  Slavery was abolished in 1886 in Cuba and 1888 in Brazil. 

Two outstanding decrees for abolition were produced during the 19th century, including the Abolition Bill passed by the British Parliament in August 1833 and the French decree signed by the Provisional Government in April 1848. In the United States, the Republican President, Abraham Lincoln, extended the abolition of slavery to the whole Union in the wake of the Civil War in 1865. The abolition of slavery in the United States – which at the time concerned approximately 4 million people - became the 13th Amendment to the Constitution of the United States.

For information on some important abolitionists of the time, see:
Toussaint-Louverture
Harriet Tubman
Frederick Douglass
Victor Schœlcher
William Wilberforce

Commemorations 

Commemorative days seek to deepen the reflection on the contemporary consequences of the slave trade and its implications in society today. Such implications include racism, racial discrimination, intolerance, and also modern forms of slavery, exploitation and human bondage. Commemorative days offer the international community occasion to meet on issues around the slave trade and slavery. They provide necessary opportunities to honour all the victims of four centuries of human tragedy, and to also celebrate those who opposed and triumphed over this "crime against humanity".

Such commemorative days include:
 International Day of Remembrance of the Victims of Slavery and the Transatlantic Slave Trade (25 March) 
The United Nations General Assembly proclaimed on 17 December 2007 Resolution A/RES/62/122 adopting 25 March as the International Day of Remembrance of the Victims of Slavery and the Transatlantic Slave Trade. The goal of this commemoration is to focus on the 400 years that lasted transatlantic slave trade as well as its long term consequences in the world.

 International Day for the Remembrance of the Slave Trade and its Abolition (23 August)
As an answer to the growing interest to and expectations generated by the launching in 1994 of The Slave Route Project, UNESCO's General Conference, by its Resolution29/C40, proclaimed the 23 August International Day for the Remembrance of the Slave Trade and its Abolition.

  International Day for the Abolition of Slavery (2 December)
The International Day for the Abolition of Slavery, 2 December, recalls the date of the adoption, by the General Assembly, of the United Nations Convention for the Suppression of the Traffic in Persons and of the Exploitation of the Prostitution of Others (Resolution 317(IV)) of 2 December 1949).

  International Year to Commemorate the Struggle against Slavery and its Abolition (2004) 
By its Resolution 57/195, the United Nations General Assembly proclaimed 2004 International Year to Commemorate the Struggle against Slavery and its Abolition. This Year marked the bicentenary and the creation of the first black State, Haiti. This country symbolises the struggle and resistance of slaves that enabled the triumph of principles of freedom, equality, dignity and individual's rights. This commemoration has also provided an avenue for a fraternal gathering between Africa, Europe, the Caribbean and the Americas.

 2011: The UN International Year for People of African Descent

Similar commemorations include:
International Day of Commemoration in Memory of the Victims of the Holocaust (27 January)
International Day for the Elimination of Racial Discrimination (21 March)
International Day for Tolerance (16 November)

Modern forms of slavery 

As declared in the 1948 United Nations Universal Declaration of Human Rights, although the means and specificities of modern and traditional forms of slavery differ considerably, the violation of human rights and human dignity are central issues in both practices. According to the International Organization for Migration (IOM), millions of people - primarily women and children - are subjected to modern forms of slavery and human trafficking. Human trafficking can be defined as "the recruitment, transportation, transfer, harbouring or receipt of persons, by means of threat or use of force or other forms of coercion, of abduction, of fraud, of deception, of the abuse of power or of a position of vulnerability or of the giving or receiving of payments or benefits to achieve the consent of a person having control over another person, for the purpose of exploitation." (UN Protocol to Prevent, Suppress and Punish Trafficking in Persons, especially Women and Children).

UNESCO's "Project to Fight Human Trafficking in Africa" aims to promote effective and culturally appropriate policy-making to combat the trafficking of women and children in Western and Southern Africa. Through policy-oriented research on factors relating to trafficking, the project collects best practice models to fight trafficking at its roots. Various training workshops are organized to present these results to policymakers, NGOs, community leaders and the media.

Furthermore, building on UNESCO's regional pillar of "extending international protection to endangered, vulnerable and minority cultures and cultural expressions", the "Trafficking and HIV/AIDS Project" based at the UNESCO Bangkok Office tackles the linked triad of problems-HIV/AIDS, trafficking, and non-traditional drug use-in the Greater Mekong Subregion. For this project, research is conducted and programs are developed to crosscut these issues and to address the needs of at-risk and vulnerable populations.

For further information, see:
 Project to fight human trafficking in Africa
 UNESCO Bangkok Trafficking and HIV/AIDS Project
 Standards and Fundamental principles and rights at work (International Labour Organisation)
 Child Labour (United Nations Children's Fund)
 Human Rights Committee (United Nations High Commissioner for Human Rights)
 Human Rights (UNESCO Sector for Social and Human Sciences)

Today various international conventions define slavery and human trafficking as a "crime against humanity" punishable by international law. See legal instruments.

Pedagogical initiatives 

The Slave Route Project places great importance on the development of materials to suit educational purposes to improve teaching about the slave trade and its consequences. Continuing the work initiated under the ASPnet Transatlantic Slave Trade (TST) Education Project. The Slave Route Project has contributed to several initiatives to develop educational/teaching materials on the slave trade and slavery for use by pupils, teachers and the general public. For example, contributions have been made to the development of content for primary and secondary school textbooks particularly in France, the United Kingdom, the Caribbean and several countries in Africa. It has also contributed to the publication of two books for young people on the subject: "Tell me about… the Slave Trade and L’esclavage raconté à nos enfants" (Telling our Children about Slavery).

Furthermore, in cooperation with the UNESCO Office in San José (Costa Rica), work on a series of four educational works and a didactic guide entitled Del olvido a la memoria [From Oblivion to Memory], designed for Central American countries, has begun under the project in order to improve knowledge of the particular features of slavery in that subregion and of the various contributions of people of African descent. The four works have just been published and a popularization drive is under way so that they may be used officially in some Central American countries.

Alongside these initiatives, the project is cooperating with the National Maritime Museum in London to produce and disseminate education and information kits on the slave trade and on slavery which will be used by students and teachers. The purpose of this programme is to facilitate the teaching of the subject through interesting and documented material.

Slavery sites around the Atlantic
UNESCO with the Colonial Williamsburg Foundation, have created and maintains the "Slavery and Remembrance" project to "engage[] the public as well as experts with issues relating to slavery, slave trade, and ways in which both are remembered today throughout the Atlantic world."  The following historic sites, memorials, and organizations related to the history of Atlantic slavery, include:
Afro-Peruvian Museum, Peru
Alejandro de Humboldt National Park, Cuba
Angerona Coffee Plantation, Cuba
Archaeological landscape of the first coffee plantations of southeastern Cuba
Barbados Museum and Historical Society
Beausoleil Plantation, Guadeloupe (Fr.)
Blue and John Crow Mountains National Park, Jamaica
Chateau de Joux, France
 The Colonial Williamsburg Foundation, United States
The Departmental Museum Victor Schœlcher, Guadeloupe (Fr.)
 EUROTAST, Denmark
Fidelin Kiln, Guadeloupe (Fr.)
Fort Fleur-d’Epée, Guadeloupe (Fr.)
Fort Louis Delgrès Guadeloupe (Fr.)
Ghana Museums and Monuments, Ghana
Historic Camagüey, Cuba
Historic Cienfuegos, Cuba
Historic Havana and Fortifications, Cuba
Historic Trinidad: the Urban Center and the Valley of the Sugar Factories, Cuba
House of Negritude and Human Rights, France
Hull Museums, United Kingdom
Indigo Plantations of the East Coast, Guadeloupe (Fr.)
International Slavery Museum, United Kingdom
L’Anse à la Barque Indigo Plantation, Guadeloupe (Fr.)
La Grivelière Plantation, Guadeloupe (Fr.)
La Mahaudière Plantation, Guadeloupe (Fr.)
Les Rotours Canal, Guadeloupe (Fr.)
Maison Abbé Grégoire, France
Middle Passage Ceremonies and Port Markers Project, United States
Monument to Abolition of Slavery, Guadeloupe (Fr.)
Municipal Museum of Guanabacoa, Cuba
Municipalities of Regla-Guanabacoa, Cuba
Murat Plantation, Guadeloupe (Fr)
Museum of Aquitaine, France
Museum of London Docklands, United Kingdom
Nantes History Museum, France
National Park Service Network to Freedom, 
Néron Plantation, Guadeloupe (Fr)
Oak Alley Foundation, United States
Periwinkle Initiative, United States
Punch Pond, Guadeloupe (Fr.)
Roussel-Trianon Plantation Guadeloupe (Fr.)
Royall House and Slave Quarters, United States
Ruins of La Demajagua Sugar Factory, Cuba
San Severino Castle, Cuba
Schomburg Center for Research in Black Culture, United States
Slave Burial Ground of Anse Sainte-Marguerite, Guadeloupe (Fr.)
The Slave Cell of Belmont Plantation, Guadeloupe (Fr.)
Slave History Museum, Nigeria
The Slave Route, Cuba
The Slave Route, Guadeloupe (Fr.)
Slavery and Revolution, United Kingdom
Thomas Jefferson Foundation Monticello, United States
El Cobre Town and Cobre mine, Cuba
Tumba Francesa, Cuba
Turks & Caicos National Museum, Turks and Caicos Islands
Vanibel Plantation, Guadeloupe, Fr.
Viñales Valley, Cuba
Whitney Plantation, United States

References

External links
 UNESCO Slave Route Project
 2011 International Year for People of African Descent, UNHCR
 Slavery and Remembrance: Guide . . ., UNESCO and The Colonial Williamsburg Foundation

Slavery